The Forward, Kyrgyzstan! was a political party in Kyrgyzstan. The party was founded on September 7, 2003. The Chairman of the party was Bolot Begaliev but one of its notable founders was Bermet Akayeva, eldest daughter of former President Askar Akayev. However, Bermet did not run as a candidate of the party. In the February 2005 parliamentary elections, the party won 17 seats.

The party was formed from the merger of five separate parties: Manas El, the New Time, the New Movement and the Party of Cooperators. On December 8, 2003 the Birimdik Party agreed to merge with the party.

Following the 2005 Tulip Revolution the future of the party was unclear, and it faded away shortly thereafter.

Election results

Jogorku Kenesh

See also
List of political parties in Kyrgyzstan
Politics of Kyrgyzstan

Political parties in Kyrgyzstan